Klinker is a surname. Notable people with the surname include:

Eric Klinker, American technology executive
Gudrun J. Klinker (born 1958), German computer scientist
Lewis William Klinker (1867–1946), American businessman, author, lecturer and public figure
Orpha Klinker (1891–1964), American artist
Sheila Klinker (born 1938), American politician
Umberto Klinker, Surinamese football player